Milind Gadhavi (Gujarati: મિલિન્દ ગઢવી b. 1 May 1985) is a Gujarati language poet and lyricist from Gujarat, India. He has penned songs for several Gujarati movies. He is a recipient of the 15th Transmedia award for best lyrics for Gujarati film, Premji: Rise of a Warrior.

Early life 
Gadhavi was born in Datrana, a village in Mendarda taluka of Junagadh district to Bharatkumar Gadhavi and Chandanbahen Gadhavi. He was educated in schools and institutions including Roopayatan, Good Samaritan English Medium High School (Amreli), Gurukul (Savarkundla), Carmel Convent High School (Junagadh), St. Xavier's High School (Jamnagar), St. Mary's School (Porbandar), Swami Vivekanand Vinay Mandir (Junagadh). He completed his Bachelor of Commerce in 2009 from Saurashtra University and M.B.A. in 2011 from the Faculty of Management Studies, M.S. University, Vadodara.

He wrote his first poem in 6th standard at the age of 11, and wrote his first ghazal in 8th standard. In 12th standard, he learned the metres of ghazal and ventured in metrical form.

Career 

Gadhavi is an Assistant Manager at Saurashtra Gramin Bank, Junagadh since 2013. His poems have been published in many eminent Gujarati literary magazines including Shabdasrishti, Gazalvishwa, Dhabak, Kumar, Kavita, Navneet Samarpan, Uddesh, Akhand Anand, Shabdalay and Tamanna. He has recited his poems at Doordarshan, Akashvani, Asmitaparva and other places of Gujarat. In July 2015, he recited his poems in Maanas Dharmrath Mushayra at Nyeri, Kenya.

Works 
Although Gadhavi has written in many different genres of poetry including ghazal, nazm, geet, sonnet, free verse, muktak, tripadi, anjani, triolet and villanelle, his main contribution is ghazal. The tender feelings of a young lover's heart and the disappointment from a lover's absence are the two sides of his ghazals. He penned 1 song, "Me to suraj ne ropyo chhe aangne", for the Gujarati movie Premji: Rise of a Warrior and started his career as a lyricist. He has penned two songs for the film Thai Jashe! (both sung by Parthiv Gohil) and one song for "I Wish", an upcoming Gujarati movie.

Filmography

Awards 
Gadhavi won the 15th Transmedia award for best lyrics in film Premji: Rise of a Warrior.

See also
 List of Gujarati-language writers

References

Gujarati-language writers
Gujarati-language poets
People from Gujarat
1985 births
People from Junagadh district
Living people
Indian lyricists
21st-century Indian poets
Maharaja Sayajirao University of Baroda alumni
Charan
Gadhavi (surname)